, also known as , is a Buddhist temple in the city of Chiba, Chiba Prefecture, Japan. The temple is located in the central Chūō District in the city of Chiba. Chiba-dera is one of many Buddhist temples in the region that, according to tradition, was established by the priest Gyōki (668–749). Chiba-dera is a temple of the Shingon Buzan Sect, and is temple number 29 in the Bandō Sanjūsankasho, or the circuit of 33 Buddhist temples in eastern Japan sacred to the Goddess Kannon.

History

Founding

The site of Chiba-dera has been used as a Buddhist temple since the early 8th century. Glazed kawara roof tiles from Buddhist structures have been uncovered within the keidai temple precinct of Chiba-dera that date to the early Nara period (710–794). By legend the priest Gyōki  (660–721) visited the temple site, which was then in the village of Ikeda, Chiba District, Shimōsa Province, in the reign of the Empress Genmei. Gyōki was moved by the large lotus flowers, an important symbol in the Buddhist tradition, and rested at the spot. The priest had a vision of the Kannon Boddhisatva, and carved and enshrined two statues of the Kannon at the spot in 709. This marks the traditional date of the founding of the temple. The Emperor Shōmu named the temple

Heian period

Archaeological evidence suggest the site was used for burials from the early Heian period, and graves from this period reveal  containers to hold hand-copied Buddhist scripture, fragments of white porcelain Buddhist statuary, and glass beads produced in China during the Song Dynasty (960–1279).

Arrival of Chiba clan

The Chiba clan, with its entrance into the Kantō region, used the area of present-day Chiba City as a power base, and took control of the temple. The clan supported and maintained Chiba-dera from the late Heian period to their downfall in the Muromachi period. According to the Chiba-shū, the history of the clan, the Chiba clan used Chiba-dera as a place to conduct rites and rituals related to the clan. Chiba-dera further benefited from the patronage of Minamoto no Yoritomo, (1147–1199). Yoritomo, after his defeat at the Battle of Ishibashiyama in 1180, sought allies in the Kantō Region. Minamoto prayed daily at Chiba-dera while forging an alliance with the Chiba clan. In recognition of the fulfillment of his prayers for military success and the aid of the Chiba clan, Yoritomo commissioned an extensive renovation of Chiba-dera in 1182 with the establishment of the Kamakura shogunate. The Chiba clan also commissioned structures and Buddhist implements over its long association with the temple, some of which survive and have been designated National Treasures of Japan. The clan invited numerous Buddhist priests and scholars to Chiba-dera, especially from the Tendai sect. In this period the temple became known as a regional center of learning.

Edo period

Chiba-dera declined greatly after the Siege of Odawara in 1590. The Chiba clan, who sided with the Hōjō clan, were completed divested of their property after their defeat by Toyotomi Hideyoshi (1536 or 1537–1598). Tokugawa Ieyasu (1543–1616), recognizing that the temple was near collapse in the disorder of the period, restored the Chiba-dera. Ieyasu rebuilt the burnt garan hall. Members of the Tokugawa clan visited and worshiped at Chiba-dera, and the temple received a 100 koku stipend in the early 17th century. Tokugawa Hidetada (1579–1632), the second Tokugawa shōgun, built a new large-scale   main hall in 1623. Despite this patronage Chiba-dera suffered numerous disastrous fires and subsequent reconstruction in the Edo period (1603–1868), notably in 1689, 1806, and 1852.

Modern history

Chiba-dera fell into steep decline after the Meiji Restoration in 1868. The temple lost its rice stipend, its sole source of income. Property was confiscated from Chiba-dera in 1869 under Shinbutsu bunri laws mandating the separation of Shintoism from Buddhism. The temple had no resident priest for much of the Meiji period (1868–1912). Supporters of the temple slowly restored Chiba-dera in the early 20th century. The temple was nearly completely destroyed by fire in World War II. Aerial bombings of Chiba City was carried by the United States as part of the wider Bombing of Tokyo in 1945. On August 6, 1945 the temple was significantly damaged by aerial bombardments, and the Kannon-dō built by Tokugawa Hidetada in 1623 was completely destroyed. In 1976 the temple celebrated the construction and opening of the current Kannon-dō.

Ginkgo tree

The keidai temple precinct of Chiba-dera is home to a large ginkgo tree. The ginkgo of Chiba-dera is estimated to be 1,000 years old.

Chiba-warai

In the Edo period a local custom existed whereby local residents donned masks on New Year's Eve, gathered at Chiba-dera, and called out complaints and used abusive languages in reference to local administrators and merchants. Chiba-warai was performed by people of all classes, men and women, young and old. Sarcastic comments  were followed by loud laughter, hence the name . At midnight the Chiba-warai ended and villagers would begin the New Year celebration. Tomokiyo Oyamada (1783–1847) described the practice in the Sōma nikki. The practice of Chiba-warai existed into the Meiji period.

The  poet Kobayashi Issa (1763–1827) wrote a haiku on the Chiba-warai.

千葉寺や　隅に子どもも　むり笑ひ
Chibadera ya sumini kodomo mo muriwarai
Chiba-dera / In corners even children / Laughing irrationally

Noted treasures 

Temple bell , 1261, designated an Important Cultural Properties of Japan
Treasure stupa , late Kamakura period, designated an Important Cultural Properties of Japan, now located at the Tokyo National Museum
Temple plaque , 1361, designated an Important Cultural Properties of Japan, now located at the Tokyo National Museum
Hexagonal copper temple lantern , early Muromachi period, designated an Important Cultural Properties of Japan, now located at the Tokyo National Museum

Order in Buddhist Pilgrimage 

 Bandō Sanjūsankasho
28 Ryushō-in　--　29 Chiba-dera　--　30 Kōzō-ji

Transportation 

10 minutes by foot from Keisei Electric Railway Chibadera Station
20 minutes by bus from numerous JR East lines at Chiba Station

See also 

 For an explanation of terms concerning Japanese Buddhism, Japanese Buddhist art, and Japanese Buddhist temple architecture, see the Glossary of Japanese Buddhism.

References

Buddhist temples in Chiba (city)
8th-century establishments in Japan
Religious buildings and structures completed in 709